The men's ISSF 50 meter pistol competition at the 2004 Summer Olympics was held on 17 August at the Markópoulo Olympic Shooting Centre near Athens, Greece. There were 42 competitors from 31 nations.

Russia's Mikhail Nestruyev, after winning air pistol silver medal, took gold in the event with a total of 663.3, just two points adrift of South Korea's Jin Jong-oh, who left only with the silver on 661.5. Meanwhile, North Korean shooter Kim Jong-su fired a total of 657.7 points to steadily round out the podium with a bronze. Nestruyev's gold was Russia's second victory in the event. Both South Korea and North Korea earned their first medals in the free pistol.

Background

This was the 21st appearance of the ISSF 50 meter pistol event. The event was held at every Summer Olympics from 1896 to 1920 (except 1904, when no shooting events were held) and from 1936 to 2016; it was open to women from 1968 to 1980. 1896 and 1908 were the only Games in which the distance was not 50 metres; the former used 30 metres and the latter 50 yards.

Three of the eight finalists, the medalists, from the 2000 Games returned: gold medalist (and 1992 finalist) Tanyu Kiryakov of Bulgaria, two-time silver medalist (and 1988 bronze medalist) Igor Basinski of Belarus, and bronze medalist (and 1988 finalist) Martin Tenk of the Czech Republic. Tan Zongliang of China was the reigning (2002) world champion, with Tenk the runner-up.

Armenia and Serbia and Montenegro each made their debut in the event. The United States made its 19th appearance, most of any nation, having missed only the 1900 event and the boycotted 1980 Games.

Nestruyev used a Morini CM84E.

Qualification

Each National Olympic Committee (NOC) could enter up to two shooters if the NOC earned enough quota sports or had enough crossover-qualified shooters. To compete, a shooter needed a quota spot and to achieve a Minimum Qualification Score (MQS). Once a shooter was using a quota spot in any shooting event, they could enter any other shooting event for which they had achieved the MQS as well (a crossover qualification). There were 21 quota spots available for the free pistol: 4 at the 2002 World Cup events, 5 at the 2002 World Championship, 4 at the 2003 World Cup events, 2 at each of the 2003 European Championships, 2003 Pan American Games, and 2004 Asian Championships, and 1 each at the 2003 Oceania Championships and 2003 African Championships. One additional quota place was added through the exchange system. There were also 20 shooters who double-started into the free pistol, primarily from the 10 metre air pistol event.

Competition format

The competition featured two rounds, qualifying and final. The qualifying round was the same as the previous competitions: each shooter fired 60 shots, in 6 series of 10 shots each, at a distance of 50 metres. The target was round, 50 centimetres in diameter, with 10 scoring rings. Scoring for each shot was up to 10 points, in increments of 1 point. The maximum score possible was 600 points. The top 8 shooters advanced to a final; ties necessary for qualifying were broken by 6th-series score, while other ties were not broken. They shot an additional series of 10 shots, with the score added to their qualifying round score to give a 70-shot total. The 1996 competition had added decimal scoring to the final; shots could score up to 10.9 for the final. The total maximum was therefore 709.0. Ties were broken first by final round score. Any pistol was permitted.

Records

Prior to this competition, the existing world and Olympic records were as follows.

No new world or Olympics records were set during the competition.

Schedule

Results

Qualifying

Final

References

External links
Official Results

Men's 50 m Pistol
Men's 2004
Men's events at the 2004 Summer Olympics